Astoria Line may refer to several transit lines:
BMT Astoria Line, a rapid transit line of the New York City Subway, serving the Queens neighborhood of Astoria
Astoria Line (Queens surface), a former streetcar line now served by Q103 (New York City bus)
Astoria Line (Manhattan) (former streetcar from Astor Place, running mainly on 2nd Avenue, to the Astoria Ferry at East 92nd Street); see List of streetcar lines in Manhattan